The common white wave (Cabera pusaria) is a moth of the family Geometridae. The species was first described by Carl Linnaeus in his 1758 10th edition of Systema Naturae. It is found throughout the Palearctic region. Their habitat is deciduous forests and their surroundings. 

This species has white wings, sometimes tinged with pink, slight grey dusted grey and with fine grey fascia (the first curved) on the forewing and two on the hindwing. ab. heveraria H.-Schiff. is a rare form in which the grey dusting densely covers almost the entire wings.  ab. rotundaria Haw. is a rounder-winged form with the first lines strongly approximated and said to be the product of under-feeding the larvae. Hybrid fletcheri Tutt (pusaria male x exanthemata female) is just intermediate between the parent forms, rather pure white, the lines tinged with ochreous. The wingspan is 32–35 mm. 

One or two broods are produced each year and the adults can be seen at any time from May to August. This moth flies at night and is attracted to light.

The larva is elongate, with a rather flattened head is very variable -green with purplish brown or blackish dorsal spots sometimes vague, purplish-brown with white spots, or grey mixed with reddish, or sometimes yellowish. It feeds on various trees and shrubs including alder, aspen, birch, oak, rowan and willow. The species overwinters as a pupa. The pupa is compact, brown, the wings olive-green.

Similar species
Cabera exanthemata (Scopoli, 1763)
Cabera leptographa (Wehrli, 1936)

References 

Chinery, Michael Collins Guide to the Insects of Britain and Western Europe 1986 (Reprinted 1991)
Skinner, Bernard Colour Identification Guide to Moths of the British Isles 1984

External links

"70.277 BF1955 Common White Wave Cabera pusaria (Linnaeus, 1758)". UKMoths. Retrieved March 26, 2019.

"07824 Cabera pusaria (Linnaeus, 1758) - Weißstirn-Weißspanner". Lepiforum e.V. Retrieved March 26, 2019.

Caberini
Moths described in 1758
Moths of Europe
Moths of Asia
Taxa named by Carl Linnaeus